Taeniolella is a genus of asexual fungi hyphomycetes in the family Mytilinidiaceae. Some of the species are lichenicolous (lichen-dwelling), others are saprophytic, while others are endophytic. The genus was circumscribed in 1958 by Canadian mycologist Stanley John Hughes, with Taeniolella exilis as the type species. Major revisions of the lichenicolous species in the genus were published in 2016 and 2018.

Species

Taeniolella alta 
Taeniolella americana 
Taeniolella andropogonis 
Taeniolella aquatilis 
Taeniolella arctoparmeliae 
Taeniolella arthoniae 
Taeniolella atra 
Taeniolella atricerebrina 
Taeniolella bhagavatiensis 
Taeniolella bilgramii 
Taeniolella breviuscula 
Taeniolella caespitosa 
Taeniolella caffra 
Taeniolella christiansenii 
Taeniolella chrysotrichis 
Taeniolella cladinicola 
Taeniolella curvata 
Taeniolella delicata 
Taeniolella dichotoma 
Taeniolella diederichiana 
Taeniolella diploschistis 
Taeniolella exilis 
Taeniolella faginea 
Taeniolella filamentosa 
Taeniolella friesii 
Taeniolella hawksworthiana 
Taeniolella hunanensis 
Taeniolella ionaspidicola 
Taeniolella lecanoricola 
Taeniolella longissima 
Taeniolella multiplex 
Taeniolella muricata 
Taeniolella pertusariicola 
Taeniolella phaeophysciae 
Taeniolella phialosperma 
Taeniolella plantaginis 
Taeniolella pseudocyphellariae 
Taeniolella pulvillus 
Taeniolella punctata 
Taeniolella pyrenulae 
Taeniolella ravenelii 
Taeniolella robusta 
Taeniolella rolfii 
Taeniolella sabalicola 
Taeniolella santessonii 
Taeniolella sapindi 
Taeniolella serusiauxii 
Taeniolella stilbospora 
Taeniolella stilbosporoides 
Taeniolella strictae 
Taeniolella subsessilis 
Taeniolella thelotrematis 
Taeniolella toruloides 
Taeniolella trapeliopseos 
Taeniolella typhoides 
Taeniolella umbilicariae 
Taeniolella umbilicariicola 
Taeniolella vermicularis 
Taeniolella verrucosa 
Taeniolella weberi

References

Mytilinidiales
Dothideomycetes genera
Lichenicolous fungi
Taxa described in 1958